The 2011 Poznań Porsche Open powered by Enea was a professional tennis tournament played on clay courts. It was the eight edition of the tournament which was part of the 2011 ATP Challenger Tour and the Tretorn SERIE+ tour. It took place at the Park Tenisowy Olimpia in Poznań, Poland from 16 to 24 July 2011, including the qualifying competition in the first two days.

Singles main draw entrants

Seeds

Other entrants
The following players received wildcards into the singles main draw:
  Piotr Gadomski
  Marcin Gawron
  Łukasz Kubot
  Bartosz Sawicki

The following players received entry from the qualifying draw:
  Tomasz Bednarek
  Kamil Čapkovič
  André Ghem
  Nicolas Renavand

Withdrawals
Before the tournament
  Marc Gicquel
  Daniel Muñoz de la Nava
  Rubén Ramírez Hidalgo
  Maxime Teixeira

Doubles main draw entrants

Seeds

Champions

Singles

 Rui Machado def.  Jerzy Janowicz, 6–3, 6–3

Doubles

 Olivier Charroin /  Stéphane Robert def.  Franco Ferreiro /  André Sá, 6–2, 6–3

References

External links
Official Website
ITF Search
ATP official site

Poznań Porsche Open
Poznań Open
Poz